Al-Mashaliḥah is a sub-district located in the Al-Makha District, Taiz Governorate, Yemen. Al-Mashaliḥah had a population of 14,527 according to the 2004 census.

References  

Sub-districts in Al-Makha District